The Shylock Suite, Op. 57 is a six-movement work by Gabriel Fauré, first performed in 1890. In addition to four purely orchestral movements it includes two serenades for solo tenor with orchestral accompaniment. The composer constructed the suite from incidental music he had written the previous year for Edmond Haraucourt's play Shylock, an adaptation of Shakespeare's The Merchant of Venice, presented at the Théâtre de l'Odéon in Paris. The theatre music had been written for a small orchestra, and Fauré greatly expanded the orchestration for the concert suite.

Background
In 1889 Fauré composed incidental music for a new play, Shylock, an adaptation by Edmond Haraucourt of Shakespeare's The Merchant of Venice. The piece was premiered at the Théâtre de l'Odéon in Paris on 17 December 1889 in a lavish production starring Gabrielle Réjane as Portia. It ran for 56 performances, a substantial run by the standards of the Odéon, where short runs were the norm.

In his biography of Fauré, Robert Orledge observes that little is known about the composition of the score other than that "the superlative Nocturne" was composed in October 1889 after a short stay with the Vicomtesse Greffulhe at her country house. Fauré wrote to her, "I was looking for a most searching musical phrase, a Venetian moonlight, for Shylock, and I found it! It is the air in your park that inspired it." Before that, Fauré had composed the two serenades for the play, which he invited Haraucourt to hear in early October. The music for the casket scene was not at that point written.

The theatre orchestra for which Fauré composed the music was not large, consisting of 15 strings, five woodwinds, a horn and a trumpet. There were nine numbers in the score composed for the Odéon, and from these Fauré extracted and arranged a six-movement suite for full orchestra – with solo tenor in two movements – adding two harps, timpani and triangle. It was first performed at a concert of the Société nationale de musique in Paris on 17 May 1890, by the singer Julien Leprestre and the society's orchestra, conducted by Jean Gabriel-Marie.

Music
The suite is scored for two flutes, two oboes, two clarinets, two bassoons, four horns, two trumpets, timpani, triangle, harp and strings. The playing time is a little under 20 minutes. Both Nectoux and Orledge comment that the inclusion of a soloist may militate against the suite's opportunities for frequent concert programming.

1. Chanson 
The suite opens with the first of two movements for singer as well as orchestra; it is marked allegro moderato (♩ = 96). The words, which bear no relation to anything in Shakespeare's play, are the invention of Haraucourt, a serenade sung by Venetian revellers. In his 2004 study of Fauré Jean-Michel Nectoux comments, "one feels for Fauré, having to set to music the worst verse in the play!" Despite this, Orledge and Nectoux both find this musically the better of the two vocal movements in the suite. In the Odéon score the piece was in C; for the suite, Fauré transposed it to B. The piece is opened by a cello solo, joined by  the two harps before the tenor and the main orchestra enter.
Fauré published versions of this, and the Madrigal from the third movement of the suite, with piano accompaniment in 1897. Nectoux finds the orchestral versions preferable: "the piano writing sounds thin and inadequate compared to that in most of his other accompaniments".

2. Entr'acte 
Despite its title in the suite, the music of the Entr'acte was not played between movements during the Odéon production. The printed programme for the premiere of the suite more accurately labelled it "Scene of the caskets". It was played in the theatre to accompany the action at Portia's house in Belmont, and is mostly pianissimo, intended as a background for spoken dialogue. It opens with a flourish of trumpets, before the main section of the movement begins with an allegretto (♩ = 84), fortissimo at first but subsiding to pianissimo after 16 bars and remaining so for the duration of the movement, except for two brief fortissimo episodes, which Nectoux conjectures accompanied the entrances of Portia's two royal suitors, the Princes of Morocco and Aragon. The movement ends softly.

3. Madrigal 
The second vocal number is another serenade, sung in Haraucourt's play by the Prince of Aragon under Portia's window. Nectoux describes it as "another insipid text, calling for another display of the 'galant' style". In Nectoux's view, Fauré's setting is less successful than in the first serenade, with melodic lines that droop and predictable harp entries in the accompaniment. It is marked allegretto; Fauré specifies no metronome mark. As in the first serenade, the original key was changed for the suite, in this case from F to E.

4. Épithalame 
An epithalamium is "a nuptial song or poem in praise of the bride and bridegroom, and praying for their prosperity". In Shylock this music followed Bassanio's success in winning Portia's hand. Orledge describes this as the first of the truly inspired movements in the suite, with "unusually sonorous orchestration", rising to passionate heights and "almost Wagnerian in its opulence";  Nectoux suggests that it foreshadows the "calm lyricism" of Debussy's 1902 opera Pelléas et Mélisande. He adds that the marking in Fauré's manuscript, "adagio non troppo", seems preferable to the unqualified "adagio" in the published score of the suite".

5. Nocturne 

In the Odéon production the Nocturne was the music for the love scene between Jessica and Lorenzo in Portia's garden. The movement is short – 27 bars in all – is in  time, in D major and marked andante molto moderato. By general consent it is the highlight of the suite. Orledge rates it as possibly the most beautiful movement in all Fauré's music for the theatre. Charles Koechlin wrote:

The main theme haunted Fauré, and he returned to it in his Romance for Cello and Piano, Op. 69 (1894), and his mélodies "Soir", Op. 83/2 (1894) and "Exaucement", Op. 106/1, from Le Jardin clos, (1914).

6. Finale 
The finale, originally titled Aubade, was, like the Entr'acte, designed to be played beneath Haraucourt's dialogue. It was written for the last scene of the play, in which all the lovers assemble together. Fauré rewrote it considerably for the suite. Although he was not especially known for his orchestration, and in other pieces occasionally delegated the task of orchestrating to an assistant, the finale of the suite shows his orchestration at its most impressive. Orledge comments, "The astonishing brilliance, lightness and variety of the orchestration more than compensate for the two rather undistinguished themes, which both undergo exciting development in this sparkling perpetuum mobile".

Ballet
In 1967 George Balanchine used the orchestral music from the Shylock suite and Fauré's Masques et bergamasques for his ballet Jewels for the New York City Ballet. The company's orchestra, conducted by Robert Irving recorded the orchestral movements of Fauré's scores for a 1986 CD set.

Recordings

In 2005 a recording of the Shylock Suite was released in which the orchestra was replaced by piano accompaniment. In the 1890s Fauré's publisher, Hamelle, issued transcriptions for piano four hands of the four orchestral movements made by Léon Boëllmann, who had arranged other orchestral music of Fauré for Hamelle.

Excerpts from the suite have been issued on records. In April 1932 Piero Coppola conducted the Orchestre de la Société des Concerts du Conservatoire in recordings of the four orchestral movements. The four movements were recorded again  in 1986 by Irving and the New York City Ballet Orchestra (see "Ballet", above). WorldCat lists recordings of the Nocturne, conducted by John Barbirolli, Enrique Bátiz, Philippe Gaubert, Jean-Jacques Kantorow and Thomas Schippers. There are also recordings of the Nocturne arranged for organ solo and for cello and piano.

Notes, references and sources

Notes

References

Sources

Further reading
Bärenreiter. In German. . .

External links
 
 Shylock: comédie en trois actes et sept tableaux – Text of Haraucourt's play (1890)

Compositions by Gabriel Fauré
Incidental music
1889 compositions
Works based on The Merchant of Venice
Music based on works by William Shakespeare